Saline is a city in Washtenaw County in the U.S. state of Michigan. The population was 8,948 at the 2020 census.  The city borders Saline Township to the southwest, and the two are administered autonomously.

History

Before the 18th century, Native Americans traveled to what is now Saline to hunt wildlife and gather salt from the salt springs they found nearby. In the 18th century, French explorers canoed up to the area and also harvested the salt. They named the local river Saline ("salty"). Europeans settled the area in the 19th century, most of them from England and Germany. Together with Orange Risdon, a government surveyor generally considered the city's founder, the residents named the town Saline, which was officially established in 1832. In 1870 railroad service, provided by the Detroit-Hillsdale-&-Indiana Railroad, first reached Saline. In 1875 Salinians built one of the city's most famous landmarks, the Second-Empire frame, -story residential building, the Davenport House, a.k.a. Curtis Mansion. The town continued to grow, and in 1931 the Village of Saline became the City of Saline. The Saline Fisheries Research Station was built on the site of a pioneer grist mill. Saline has had its own newspaper since ca. 1874 but the Saline Reporter was shuttered by its owner, Digital First Media, in 2014. The Saline Post, an independent outlet, now serves the community.

The city is popular for its annual Celtic Festival, which attracts people from all over the U.S. and its sister cities Brecon, Wales, United Kingdom (established 1966) and Lindenberg, Germany (established 2003).

Geography

The Saline River runs through the city.

Major highways
 runs briefly through the center of the city.

Demographics

2010 census
As of the census of 2010, there were 8,810 people, 3,699 households, and 2,336 families residing in the city. The racial makeup of the city was 93.6% White, 1.4% African American, 0.2% Native American, 2.5% Asian, 0.4% from other races, and 1.8% from two or more races. Hispanic or Latino of any race were 2.6% of the population.

There were 3,699 households, of which 33.2% had children under the age of 18 living with them, 49.1% were married couples living together, 10.6% had a female householder with no husband present, 3.5% had a male householder with no wife present, and 36.8% were non-families. 32.1% of all households were made up of individuals, and 13.3% had someone living alone who was 65 years of age or older. The average household size was 2.34 and the average family size was 3.00.

The median age in the city was 41.1. 24.5% of residents were under age 18; 7.1% were between the ages of 18 and 24; 24.2% were from 25 to 44; 29.6% were from 45 to 64; and 14.6% were 65 years of age or older. The gender makeup of the city was 47.0% male and 53.0% female.

2000 census
As of the census of 2000, there were 8,034 people, 3,148 households, and 2,134 families residing in the city. The racial makeup of the city was 95.69% White, 0.56% African American, 0.32% Native American, 1.94% Asian, 0.05% Pacific Islander, 0.32% from other races, and 1.11% from two or more races. Hispanic or Latino of any race were 1.73% of the population.

There were 3,048 households, out of which 38.7% had children under the age of 18 living with them, 54.2% were married couples living together, 10.8% had a female householder with no husband present, and 32.2% were non-families. 27.8% of all households were made up of individuals, and 9.7% had someone living alone who was 65 years of age or older. The average household size was 2.49 persons and the average family size was 3.09 persons. In the city, the population was spread out, with 28.6% under age 18, 5.7% from 18 to 24, 32.6% from 25 to 44, 21.8% from 45 to 64, and 11.3% 65 years old or older. The median age was 36. For every 100 females, there were 86.6 males. For every 100 females 18 and older, there were 81.2 males.

The median income for a household in the city was $59,382, and the median income for a family was $73,162. Males had a median income of $51,391 versus $32,254 for females. The per capita income for the city was $26,208. About 3.0% of families and 4.0% of the population were below the poverty line, including 4.0% of those under age 18 and 4.3% of those age 65 or over.

The Ann Arbor Railroad also operates as far as Maple Road in the north of the city, but this portion is only used as a siding for the Faurecia Plant and only freight service is offered.

Education

Saline Area Schools operates the public schools.

K–3 elementary schools operated by the district include Harvest, Woodland Meadows, and Pleasant Ridge. Heritage School (4–5), Saline Middle School, and Saline High School (in Pittsfield Charter Township) serve the city.

Notable people
George Matthew Adams, newspaperman
Jennifer Allison, writer
Chris Baker, football player
Lisa Bonder, professional tennis player and ex-wife of Kirk Kerkorian.
Frank Jay Haynes, photographer
Jeremy Kittel, musician
Bobby Korecky, baseball player
Ann Pellegreno, aviator
Taybor Pepper, football player
Charles Van Riper, pioneer in speech pathology
Bryan Thao Worra, writer

Sister cities

Brecon, Wales, United Kingdom since 1966
Lindenberg im Allgäu, Germany since 2003

See also
 Rentschler Farm Museum

References

External links

 City of Saline official website
 Saline Area Historical Society

Cities in Washtenaw County, Michigan
Populated places established in 1832
1832 establishments in Michigan Territory
Michigan State Historic Sites in Washtenaw County, Michigan